Ejulve is a municipality located in the Andorra-Sierra de Arcos comarca, province of Teruel, Aragon, Spain. According to the 2011 census (INE), the municipality has a population of 203 inhabitants.

Surrounding municipalities
The following diagram displays municipalities within a  radius of Ejulve.

References 

Municipalities in the Province of Teruel